Adam Falkenstein (17 September 1906 – 15 October 1966) was a German Assyriologist.

He was born in Planegg, near Munich in Bavaria and died in Heidelberg.

Life 
Falkenstein studied Assyriology in Munich and Leipzig. He was involved primarily with cuneiform, particularly discoveries in Uruk, and with the Sumerians and their language.
From 1930 onward, Falkenstein taught as a professor of Assyriology at the Göttingen University. In 1940 he accepted a teaching assignment at Heidelberg University as a professor of semitic languages. He joined the Nazi Party in 1939. In 1941 he flew to Baghdad with  Fritz Grobba when Haj Amin al-Husseini and Rashid Ali al-Gaylani organized a brief, pro-German coup supported by weapons shipments from the German Reich. Afterward he was employed by the German foreign service in Turkey. Nothing is known about his de-nazification.

From 1939 to 1944 he was editor of the professional journal "Orientalische Literaturzeitung"; from 1950 until his death in 1966 he edited the "Zeitschrift für Assyriologie". In the early 1950s he resumed teaching at Heidelberg University.

Literary works 
 Literarische Keilschrifttexte aus Uruk (1931)
 Haupttypen der sumerischen Beschwörungen (1931)
 Die archaische Keilschrifttexte aus Uruk (1936)
 Topographie von Uruk (1941)
 Grammatik der Sprache Gudeas von Lagaš (1949-1950)
 Sumerische und Akkadische Hymnen und Gebete (1953, with Wolfram von Soden)

References

External links
 

1906 births
1966 deaths
People from the Kingdom of Bavaria
Linguists from Germany
German Assyriologists
German male non-fiction writers
20th-century linguists